Lt. Daniel Pond was a prominent early settler of Dedham, Massachusetts.

Life in Dedham
Pond arrived in Dedham around 1652 and purchased land from Nathaniel Fisher and Ralph Wheelock. Pond served as a selectman in Dedham for 14 terms, beginning in 1661. As a selectmen, he was one of ten men, or roughly 5% of the adult male population, who filled 60% of the seats on the board.

Pond and Ezra Morse were given permission by the Town to erect a new corn mill on Mother Brook, so long as it was completed by June 24, 1665. He performed several carpentry jobs on the meetinghouse of the First Church and Parish in Dedham, including hanging the first bell.

When the town of Wrentham, Massachusetts split off from Dedham, he became an owner of real estate there as well. He was awarded several lots there, but probably never lived in Wrentham.

He was a lieutenant in the militia and took the freeman's oath in 1690. He was a husbandman.

Family
He married Abigail Shepard around 1652, a member of the church in Cambridge, Massachusetts. They had a daughter, also named Abigail, who was born in Dedham but not baptized there. A son was baptized, however, on August 22, 1653, less than two weeks after he joined the church on the 11th. They had seven children, including John, Ephraim, Robert, and Jabez.

After his wife died on July 5, 1661, he married Ann Edwards two months later. He died on February 4, 1697-8 and Ann outlived him.

References

Works cited

 

Military personnel from Dedham, Massachusetts
Signers of the Dedham Covenant
Dedham, Massachusetts selectmen